Ogonowice may refer to the following places in Poland:
Ogonowice, Lower Silesian Voivodeship (south-west Poland)
Ogonowice, Łódź Voivodeship (central Poland)